Ismael Jose Barroso Bernay (born 27 January 1983) is a Venezuelan professional boxer. He held the WBA interim lightweight title from 2015 to 2016, and challenged once for the WBA world lightweight title in the latter year.

Professional career
Barroso made his professional debut on 13 August 2005 against Carlos Cardenas. Their fight ended in a four-round points draw. In his next fight, which took place nearly three years later on 31 March 2008, Barroso scored a first-round stoppage over Rafael May; his first of many knockout wins. Barroso's first outing on a major stage came on 12 December 2015 on the undercard of Anthony Joshua vs. Dillian Whyte against Kevin Mitchell for the vacant WBA interim lightweight title. From the opening round, Mitchell was unable to fend off the highly aggressive southpaw style of Barroso, who knocked him down three times. By the fifth round, the referee spared Mitchell from further damage and stopped the fight. Immediately afterwards, Mitchell had to be given oxygen by ringside doctors.

On 7 May 2016, Barroso endured a reversal of fortune when he faced Anthony Crolla for the WBA lightweight title, having travelled to England for a second time. Despite getting off to a similar start as he did against Mitchell, landing many hard punches and backing Crolla up, Barroso's onslaught began to wane in round five. In the sixth, Crolla scored a knockdown after a series of body shots, which was repeated in round seven. This time, Barroso was unable to make the referee's count, handing him his first defeat.

Professional boxing record

References

External links

1983 births
Living people
Venezuelan male boxers
People from El Tigre
Lightweight boxers
Light-welterweight boxers